Now Playing is the first studio album by Filipino and former MYMP lead singer Juris on Star Records, released on February 10, 2010, in the Philippines in CD format and in digital download through iTunes and Amazon.com. It contained 14 tracks including 12 original OPM compositions and one cover song. The album was certified platinum.

Background
Juris signed a two-year contract with Star Records after leaving her acoustic group MYMP for six years and Ivory Records. Now Playing serves as her launching album to Star Records which includes two of her original compositions. One of them is produced and musically composed by Aiza Seguerra called “Di Lang Ikaw” that is used as the love theme song of TV series Rubi.  The carrier single is "I Don’t Want To Fall". The album consists of pop songs but mainly of ballads. The sound of the album is also a departure from her previous all-acoustic style.

Certifications
The album was certified gold record awarded by Philippine Association of the Record Industry(PARI) in October 2010. And became certified platinum in June 2011.

Awards & Citation

Track listing

 Track 13 "Nariyan Ka" is also included in May Bukas Pa soundtrack album.
 Track 14 "I Love You Goodbye" is originally by Celine Dion and used as the main theme song of the Filipino film of the same title released by Star Cinema.

References

External links
 
 
 

Star Music albums
2010 albums
Tagalog-language albums
Juris Fernandez albums